Tain River is a river,  which flows through Jaman North District of the Brong Ahafo Region of Ghana. It is a tributary of the Black Volta, and empties into the Atlantic Ocean.

References

Rivers of Ghana
Brong-Ahafo Region